The Monterrey Consensus was the outcome of the 2002 Monterrey Conference, the United Nations International Conference on Financing for Development. in Monterrey, Mexico. It was adopted by Heads of State and Government on 22 March 2002. Over fifty Heads of State and two hundred Ministers of Finance, Foreign Affairs, Development and Trade participated in the event. Governments were joined by the Heads of the United Nations, the International Monetary Fund (IMF), the World Bank and the World Trade Organization (WTO), prominent business and civil society leaders and other stakeholders. New development aid commitments from the United States and the European Union and other countries were made at the conference. Countries also reached agreements on other issues, including debt relief, fighting corruption, and policy coherence.

Since its adoption the Monterrey Consensus has become the major reference point for international development cooperation. The document embraces six areas of Financing for Development:

 Mobilizing domestic financial resources for development.
 Mobilizing international resources for development: foreign direct investment and other private flows.
 International Trade as an engine for development.
 Increasing international financial and technical cooperation for development.
 External Debt.
 Addressing systemic issues: enhancing the coherence and consistency of the international monetary, financial and trading systems in support of development.

Some critics suggest that the US has ignored the Monterrey Consensus because the amount of US official development assistance (0.18% of its gross domestic product in 2008), is still well below the 0.7% target, which it endorsed in the Consensus.  It is much lower than some other developed countries, especially those in Northern Europe. The United Kingdom, for example, reached its target of giving at least 0.7% of GNI in official aid in 2014.

The Monterrey Consensus was updated at Doha, Qatar in 2008, and again at Addis Ababa in 2015.

2008 Follow-up Conference in Doha, Qatar
The Follow-up International Conference on Financing for Development to Review the Implementation of the Monterrey Consensus (Doha, Qatar, 28 November – 2 December 2008) was attended by some 40 Heads of State or Government, 9 Deputy Heads of State or Government, 50 ministers and 17 vice-ministers of foreign affairs, finance, development cooperation and trade, as well as other high-level officials of 170 States and major institutional stakeholders.

Doha Declaration

Following intense intergovernmental negotiations, the Conference concluded with the adoption of the Doha Declaration on Financing for Development (http://www.un.org/esa/ffd/doha/documents/Doha_Declaration_FFD.pdf). The two key messages included in the document were a strong commitment by developed countries to maintain their Official Development Assistance (ODA) targets irrespective of the current financial crisis, and a decision to hold a UN Conference at the highest level on the impact of the current financial and economic crisis on development.

Other main highlights of the Doha Declaration are:

Domestic resource mobilization: the importance of national ownership of development strategies and of an inclusive financial sector, as well as the need for strong policies on good governance, accountability, gender equality and human development.

Mobilizing international resources for development: the need to improve the enabling environment and to expand the reach of private flows to a greater number of developing countries.

International trade as an engine for development: the importance of concluding the Doha round of multilateral trade negotiations as soon as possible.

External debt: the need to strengthen crisis prevention mechanisms and to consider enhanced approaches for debt restructuring mechanisms.

Addressing systemic issues: the need to review existing global economic governance arrangements, with a view to comprehensive reforms of the international financial system and institutions.

Plenary meetings

The Conference was chaired by the Emir of Qatar and included seven plenary meetings. A total of 133 Governments made statements to the plenary. The Secretary-General of the United Nations, the President of the General Assembly, the Director-General of WTO, the Secretary-General of UNCTAD and the Administrator of UNDP spoke at the opening.

In their statements, Member States took stock of the progress made in the implementation of the Monterrey Consensus, identified obstacles and constraints encountered and put forward ideas and proposals to overcome these difficulties. Many statements focused on the consequences of the global financial crisis for development and the need for bold and urgent measures to address them. Much attention was also devoted to the food and energy crises and to the untapped potential of innovative sources of finance.

Amb. Oscar de Rojas, a former Venezuelan diplomat and Director of the U.N.'s Financing for Development Office, served as Executive Secretary of both the Doha and Monterrey conferences.

Round tables

Six interactive multi-stakeholder round tables were held concurrently with the plenary meetings, centering on the six thematic areas of the Monterey Consensus. Each round table was co-chaired by two Heads of State or Government and ministers from developing and developed countries and moderated by a high-level official of the major institutional stakeholders.

Panelists included HRH Princess Maxima of the Netherlands; S-G’s Special Envoys for the Conference, Mr. Trevor Manuel, South African Finance Minister and Ms. Heidemarie Weiczorek-Zeul, German Minister for Development Cooperation. Following presentations by panelists, interactive discussions took place among representatives of Member States, inter-governmental organizations, UN agencies, civil society and the business sector.

Pre-conference events

The Conference was preceded by a high-level retreat on the global financial crisis, hosted on 28 November by the Secretary-General of the United Nations and the Emir of Qatar. The retreat was attended by some 30 Heads of State or Government and ministers from both developed and developing countries, as well as high-level representatives of the major institutional stakeholders. The retreat was meant to serve as a “bridge” between the discussions on the financial crisis that had taken place among smaller groups of countries and the wider membership of the United Nations.

A Global Forum of Civil Society was held from 26 to 27 November on the theme “Investing in people-centered development” and attracted participation of more than 250 civil society organizations and networks. In addition, an International Business Forum, held on 28 November focused on mobilizing private sector resources for development and was attended by more than 200 participants from the private sector.

Side events

More than 50 side events took place at the Conference site. In the spirit of Monterrey, the organizers were Governments, inter-governmental and non-governmental organizations and the business sector. The issues of inclusive and innovative financing for development featured prominently in several side events. High-level speakers included: HRH Princess Maxima of the Netherlands, the President of Tanzania.

Source: http://www.un.org/esa/desa/desaNews/v13n01/global.html#Doha

For more information: http://www.un.org/esa/ffd/doha/index.htm

Press and NGO reactions to the Doha Conference

The press noted that few leaders of Western countries attended the meeting. The meeting was also marked by the absence of the heads of  the Bretton Woods institutions (World Bank and IMF). The United States aid chief still thought the meeting was worthwhile, and welcomed the outcome. Other, such as the Eurodad network criticised it.
 Conference website: http://www.un.org/esa/ffd/doha/

2015 - Third international Conference in Addis Ababa
The Third International Conference on Financing for Development was held in Addis Ababa from 13 to 16 July 2015. It adopted the Addis Ababa Action Agenda (AAAA). Details of the conference are at the UN official site.

See also
 Development Assistance Committee
 Aid effectiveness
 Washington Consensus
 United Nations Millennium Campaign

References

External links
 The Monterrey Consensus
 UN Department of Economic and Social Affairs Follow up process to the International Conference on Financing for Development
 United Nations Non-Governmental Liaison Service Civil society engagement in follow up process

International development
Economic development policy
United Nations documents
2002 in Mexico
2008 in Qatar
2015 in Ethiopia
2002 in international relations
2008 in international relations
2015 in international relations